The Carnegie Library at Adams and Columbus Ave. in Sandusky, Ohio, also known as the Sandusky Public Library, was built in 1901.  It was listed on the National Register of Historic Places in 1975.  It was designed by architect Albert D'Oench.

Fundraising for a library was begun in 1886 by a Library Funding Association.  It is a -story building. It was designed by New York City firm D'Oench and Yost (Albert D'Oench and Joseph W. Yost). Yoat worked in Columbus, Ohio before moving to New York City and joining D'Oench. The building has elements of Jacobean Revival style including steep triangular gables, rectangular windows divided by stone mullions, bay windows, and towers with curved roofs.

See also
List of Carnegie libraries in Ohio

References

External links
 

Library buildings completed in 1901
Libraries on the National Register of Historic Places in Ohio
Buildings and structures in Sandusky, Ohio
Carnegie libraries in Ohio
National Register of Historic Places in Erie County, Ohio
1901 establishments in Ohio